Pachypeltis is a genus of lichen-forming fungi in the family Teloschistaceae. The genus was circumscribed in 2013 by Ulrik Søchting, Patrik Frödén, and Ulf Arup.

Species
Pachypeltis castellana 
Pachypeltis cladodes 
Pachypeltis intrudens

References

Teloschistales
Lichen genera
Taxa described in 2013
Teloschistales genera